The Trinidad and Tibago men's national water polo team is the representative for Trinidad and Tobago in international men's water polo. The team competed at the 2015 Pan American Games in Toronto, Canada.

References

Water polo
Men's national water polo teams
National water polo teams in North America
National water polo teams by country
Men's sport in Trinidad and Tobago